The Ypoá National Park, was created by decree of the Executive State Nro. 43,681 dated May 29 of 1992. It is located between the departments of Paraguarí, Central and Ñeembucú, and a portion of the districts of Caapucú, Villa Oliva, San Roque González de Santa Cruz and Quiíndy. It has a total area of 1,000 square kilometres and is 150 kilometers away from Asunción.

One of the objectives is the preservation and protection of the wetlands of Ñeembucú and of the biodiversity of ecosystems and characteristic species of it. Also protects natural landscapes of and exceptional beauty.

The occupation of the area is really old, a sample of that is the oriental coast with extensive strings formed by accumulation of mollusc valves, predominating Ampllaria and Diplodon, and rests of campfires made by primitive inhabitants.

The vegetation in this area is related directly with the eco-region of Ñeembucú, where can be found species such as espinillo, palo negro, ingá, lapacho, yvyra ovi, among others. Also pacurí and al yuasy-iy can be found. The riparian an aquatic vegetation is formed by camalote, caña brava, pirí, among others.

Its fauna is very variate with species such as the toucanos, ñandú, suruku'a, inambú, mbiguá, chahá, taguatí, caburé, carpincho, rabbits, monkeys, guazutí, stags, agurá, crocodiles, teja, snakes and others.

The park was listed as a "Wetland of International Importance" under the Ramsar Convention on June 7, 1995.

See also
List of national parks of Paraguay

References

National parks of Paraguay
Ramsar sites in Paraguay
Protected areas established in 1992
Paraguarí Department
Central Department
Ñeembucú Department
1992 establishments in South America
Humid Chaco